Irish women's soccer team may refer to:

 Northern Ireland women's national football team
 Notre Dame Fighting Irish women's soccer team, NCAA college team at Notre Dame University, Indiana, United States
 Republic of Ireland women's national football team